For any complex number written in polar form (such as ), the phase factor is the complex exponential factor.  As such, the term "phase factor" is related to the more general term phasor, which may have any magnitude (i.e. not necessarily on the unit circle in the complex plane).  The phase factor is a unit complex number, i.e. a complex number of absolute value 1.  It is commonly used in quantum mechanics.  

The variable  appearing in such an expression is generally referred to as the phase.  Multiplying the equation of a plane wave  by a phase factor shifts the phase of the wave by :

In quantum mechanics, a phase factor is a complex coefficient  that multiplies a ket  or bra . It does not, in itself, have any physical meaning, since the introduction of a phase factor does not change the expectation values of a Hermitian operator. However, differences in phase factors between two interacting quantum states can sometimes be measurable (such as in the Berry phase) and this can have important consequences.

In optics, the phase factor is an important quantity in the treatment of interference.

See also
 Berry phase
 Bra-ket notation
 Euler's formula
 Phasor
 Plane wave
 The circle group U(1)

Notes

References

Information theory
Quantum information science
Notation